The 43rd Annual GMA Dove Awards presentation ceremony was held on Thursday, April 19, 2012, at 7:30 P.M. EST at the Fox Theatre in Atlanta, Georgia. The ceremony recognized the accomplishments of musicians and other figures within the Christian music industry for the year 2011. The ceremony was produced by the Gospel Music Association and was hosted by actor David Mann and comedian Chonda Pierce. The awards show was broadcast on the Gospel Music Channel on April 24, 2012.

Performers
The following musical artists performed at the 43rd GMA Dove Awards:

Yolanda Adams
Kim Burrell
Blanca Callahan from Group 1 Crew
Jason Castro
Jason Crabb
Danny Gokey
Jamie Grace
Natalie Grant
The Isaacs
Kari Jobe
LeCrae
Crystal Lewis
Mandisa
Donnie McClurkin
Karen Peck-Gooch
Todd Smith
Ruben Studdard
Russ Taff
Michael Tait
The Tenors

Nominees and winners

This is a complete list of the nominees for the 43rd GMA Dove Awards. The winners are in bold.

General
Song of the Year
"Alive" – Natalie Grant
Bernie Herms, Nichole Nordeman, songwriters
"Blessings" – Laura Story
Laura Story, songwriter
"Celebrate Me Home" – The Perrys
Joel Lindsey, Wayne Haun, songwriters
"Glorious Day (Living He Loved Me)" – Casting Crowns
Michael Bleecker, Mark Hall, songwriters
"Hold Me" – Jamie Grace
Jamie Grace Harper, Toby McKeehan, Christopher Steve, songwriters
"I Smile" – Kirk Franklin
Kirk Franklin, James Harris, Terry Lewis, Fred Tackett, songwriters
"I've Been Here Before" – Ernie Haase & Signature Sound
Ernie Haase, Joel Lindsey, Wayne Haun, songwriters
"Please Forgive Me" – Gaither Vocal Band
Gerald Crabb, songwriter
"Who Am I" – Jason Crabb
Rusty Goodman, songwriter
"Your Great Name" – Natalie Grant
Krissy Nordhoff, Michael Neale, songwriters

Male Vocalist of the Year
Chris August
Chris Tomlin
Jason Crabb
Kirk Franklin
Steven Curtis Chapman

Female Vocalist of the Year
Francesca Battistelli
Kari Jobe
Laura Story
Mandisa
Natalie Grant

Group of the Year
Casting Crowns
David Crowder Band
Gaither Vocal Band
NEEDTOBREATHE
The Isaacs

Artist of the Year
Jason Crabb
Laura Story
LeCrae
The Isaacs

New Artist of the Year
Beyond the Ashes
Dara Maclean
Jamie Grace
Royal Tailor
The City Harmonic

Producer of the Year;
Bernie Herms
Brown Bannister
Ed Cash
Ian Eskelin
Michael Sykes
Wayne Haun

Rap/Hip Hop & Urban

Rap/Hip Hop Recorded Song of the Year
"Hallelujah" – Lecrae
"Intoxicated" – JayEss
"Please Don't Let Me Go" – Group 1 Crew
"Backlight" – Tedashii
"The Overdose" – LeCrae

Rap/Hip Hop Album of the Year
Blacklight – Tedashii
Captured – FLAME
Culture Shock – Jai
 Rehab: The Overdose – LeCrae
The Whole Truth – Da' T.R.U.T.H.

Urban Recorded Song of the Year
"All I Need" feat. Chris Lee – FLAME
"Make It Loud" – Martha Munizzi
Sovereign King" – Deborah
"Sweeter" – Kim Burrell

Urban Album of the Year
Angel & Chanelle - Trin-i-tee 5:7
Church on the Moon - Deitrick Haddon
From Now On - Dawkins & Dawkins
Something Big - Mary Mary
The Next Dimension - G.I..
How I Got Over - Smokie Norful

Rock

Rock/Contemporary Recorded Song of the Year
"Dark Horses" – Switchfoot
"Faceless" – Red
"Invisible" – Disciple
"One Day Too Late" – Skillet
"Born Again" – Newsboys
"Crazy Love" – Hawk Nelson
"Drifting" – Plumb with Dan Haseltine
"Lucy" – Skillet

Rock Album of the Year
Control – Abandon
Until We Have Faces – Red
Vice Verses – Switchfoot
What I've Become – Ashes Remain
With Shivering Hearts We Wait – Blindside

Rock/Contemporary Album of the Year
Ad Astra per Aspera – Abandon Kansas
Come Home – Luminate
Crazy Love – Hawk Nelson
The Reckoning – NEEDTOBREATHE

Pop

Pop/Contemporary Recorded Song of the Year
"Alive (Mary Magdalene)" – Natalie Grant
"Blessings" – Laura Story
"Hold Me" – Jamie Grace
"Someone Worth Dying For" – MIKESCHAIR

Pop/Contemporary Album of the Year
A Beautiful Life – MIKESCHAIR
Blessings – Laura Story
Hundred More Years – Francesca Battistelli
One Song at a Time – Jamie Grace
What If We Were Real – Mandisa

Inspirational

Inspirational Recorded Song of the Year
"All Things New" – Nicol Sponberg
"Hope of the Broken World" – Selah
"I Surrender" – The Martins
"I'll Take What's Left" – Doug Anderson
"Love Is a Cross" – Russ Taff

Inspirational Album of the Year
A Man Like Me – Wes Hampton
Captivated – Nicole C. Mullen
Faroe Islands – Russ Taff
God Is Able – Hillsong Church
Hope of the Broken World – Selah

Gospel

Southern Gospel Recorded Song of the Year
"Celebrate Me Home" – The Perrys
 "If There Ever Was A Time" – The Crabb Family
"I've Been Here Before" – Ernie Haase & Signature Sound
"Please Forgive Me" – Gaither Vocal Band
"Victory In Jesus" – John Hagee

Traditional Gospel Recorded Song of the Year
 "God Is Great" –Ricky Dillard & New G
"Here Comes Jesus" – Russ Taff
 "Hold On" – Christ Tabernacle Choir
 "I Saw the Light" – Jason Crabb
"Let the Church Say Amen" – Andraé Crouch

Contemporary Gospel Recorded Song of the Year
"He Has His Hands On You" – Marvin Sapp
"I Smile" – Kirk Franklin
"I'd Rather Have Jesus" – Jason Crabb
"The Promise" – Andraé Crouch
"What I Have I Give" – Beyond the Ashes

Southern Gospel Album of the Year
A Lifetime of Music – John Hagee
Miracles & Memories – Bowling Family
Part of the Family – Collingsworth Family
Reach Out – Karen Peck and New River
The Song Lives On – Jason Crabb

Traditional Gospel Album of the Year
How I Got Over – Smokie Norful
If You Didn't Know Now You Know – Norman Hutchins
Promises – Richard Smallwood
The Legacy Project – John P. Kee
XV Live – Chicago Mass Choir

Contemporary Gospel Album of the Year
Becoming – Yolanda Adams
Change the Atmosphere – Christ Tabernacle Choir
Committed – Committed
Hello Fear – Kirk Franklin
Make It Loud – Martha Munizzi

Country & Bluegrass

Bluegrass Recorded Song of the Year
"Indescribable" – Bluegrass Meets Worship
 "Let It Go" – Ralph Stanley
 "Mama's Teaching Angels How to Sing" – The Isaacs
"Precious Memories" – Doyle Lawson & Quicksilver
"The Water is Calling" – Marcy Each

Country Recorded Song of the Year
 "Dreamin' Wide Awake" – Doug Anderson
"Good Things Are Happening" – Karen Peck & New River
"I Get To" – Jeff & Sheri Easter
"Pray About Everything" – Guy Penrod
"Why Me" – Jason Crabb (feat. William Lee Golden and Bill Gaither)

Bluegrass Album of the Year
A Mother's Prayer – Ralph Stanley
Family Chain – John Bowman
Grassroots Rambos – Rambo McGuire
Indescribable: Bluegrass Meets Worship – Chigger Hill Boys & Terri
Satisfied – Paul Williams & the Victory Trio

Country Album of the Year
Brighter One – Marshall Hall
Dreamin' Wide Awake – Doug Anderson
Family Ties – Wilburn & Wilburn
Going Places – Crabb Revival
New Day – The Martins

Praise & Worship

Worship Song of the Year
"Beautiful Things" – Gungor, songwriter
" Glorious Day (Living He Loved Me)" – Michael Bleecker, Mark Hall, songwriters
"Hosanna" – Brooke Fraser, songwriter
"I Give Myself Away" – William McDowell, Sam Hinn, songwriters
"When the Stars Burn Down" – Jonathan Lee, Jennie Riddle, songwriters
" Your Great Name" – Michael Neale, Krissy Nordhoff, songwriters

Praise & Worship Album of the Year
10,000 Reasons – Matt Redman
Aftermath – Hillsong United
And If Our God Is for Us... – Chris Tomlin
Ghosts Upon the Earth – Gungor
Make It Loud – Martha Munizzi

Others

Instrumental Album of the Year
A Moments Peace, Vol. 3 – Great Worship Songs Players
Feedback – Derek Webb
Inspirational Moods: Inspiring Hymns featuring Piano and Orchestra – Michael Omartian
Jesus Calling: Instrumental Songs For Devotion – Various Artists
Unfailing Love: 20 Worship Songs of Comfort and Peace – Stan Whitmire

Children's Music Album of the Year
From The Inside out For Kids – Kids Choir
Great Worship Songs For Kids, Vol. 5 – Great Worship Songs Kids Praise Band
Groovy – Denver and the Mile High Orchestra
Hosanna! Today's Top Worship Songs for Kids – VeggieTales feat. Mark Hall from Casting Crowns and Amy Grant
I Am a Promise – Gaither Vocal Band

Spanish Language Album of the Year
25 Concierto Conmemorativo – Marcos Witt
De Vuelta Al Jardin – Christine D'Clario
Dile Al Corazon Que Camine – Jacobo Ramos
Más Fuerte Que Nunca – Coalo Zamorano
Somos Uno – Generación 12
Top 25 Cantos de Alabanza 2012 – Various

Special Event Album of the Year
Ashes To Fire: Songs of Remembrance and Celebration of the Passion – Consuming Worship
Medicine: Live At The Black Academy – Ruben Studdard and Various Artists
Passion: Here for You – Passion
The Journey – Andraé Crouch
Music Inspired by The Story – Matthew West, Leigh Nash, Mark Hall of Casting Crowns, Megan Garret of Casting Crowns, Brandon Heath, Bart Millard of MercyMe, Michael Tait, Blanca Callahan of Group 1 Crew, LeCrae, Chris Tomlin, Peter Furler, Mandisa, Todd Smith of Selah, Michael W. Smith, Jeremy Camp, Dan Haseltine, Matt Hammit of Sanctus Real, Steven Curtis Chapman, Natalie Grant, Mac Powell, Nichole Nordeman, Amy Grant, Francesca Battistelli, and Darlene Zschech. Songs were written by Nichole Nordeman and Bernie Herms and inspired by the best-selling book The Story.

Christmas Album of the Year
A Skaggs Family Christmas Volume 2 – Ricky Skaggs, The Whites, Molly Skaggs, Luke Skaggs, and Rachel Leftwich
Christmas Hope – Benjamin Utecht
Christmas in Diverse City – TobyMac
Irish Country Christmas – Craig Duncan
Oh For Joy – David Crowder Band

Choral Collection of the Year
 A Brooklyn Tabernacle Christmas – Carol Cymbala, Jason Webb
 Everlasting Praise 3 – Mike Speck, Stan Whitmire
O What A Savior – Dave Clark, Steve W. Mauldin
Ready to Sing the Songs of Bill and Gloria Gaither – Russell Mauldin and Johnathan Crumpton
When the Stars Burn Down – Travis Cottrell

Recorded Music Packaging
A Way to See in the Dark (Special Edition) – Jason Gray
Burlap to Cashmere – Burlap to Cashmere
Christmas in Diverse City – TobyMac
Leveler (Deluxe Edition) – August Burns Red
This Is What We Believe (Deluxe Edition) – Aaron Shust

Musicals

Musical of the Year
Come and Adore Him – Dave Clark, Steve W. Mauldin
Down From His Glory – Mike Speck
Gone – Geron Davis
Love Won – Kenna Turner West
Mary, Did You Know? A Ready to Sing Christmas – Russell Mauldin, Sue C. Smith and Johnathan Crumpton

  Youth/Children's Musical of the Year
 Extreme, Songs for Modern Youth Choir – Cliff Duren and Johnathan Crumpton
God of This City – Susie Williams, David Ebensberger & Luke Gambill
Help! My Kids Have to Sing at Christmas! – Cherry Garasi
The Amazing Grace Race – Celeste Clydesdale, David T. Clydesdale
 The Great Christmas Giveaway – Celeste Clydesdale, David T. Clydesdale

Videos

Short Form Music Video of the Year
7x70 – Chris August
A Thousand Generations – Sean Spicer with Tilly Cryar
As For Me and My House – John Waller
Crazy Love – Hawk Nelson
Feed the Machine – Red
I Lift My Hands – Chris Tomlin
Miracles – Newsboys
You Are More – Tenth Avenue North

Long Form Video of the Year
A Skaggs Family Christmas LIVE – Ricky Skaggs, The Whites, Molly Skaggs, Luke Skaggs, and Rachel Leftwich
Fear Not Tomorrow – The Collingsworth Family
Tent Revival Homecoming – Bill Gaither, Gloria Gaither, and Homecoming Friends
The Song Lives On – Jason Crabb
Yahweh – Hillsong Chapel

References

External links 
 
 GMC Promo Video

2012 music awards
GMA Dove Awards
2012 in American music
2012 in Georgia (U.S. state)
GMA